Muhammad Riaz (born 27 February 1996) is a Pakistani footballer who plays for Asia Ghee Mills and the Pakistan national team.

International career
Riaz appeared for Pakistan's U-23 team at the 2014 Asian Games in a 1–0 loss to the Chinese U-23 team. Riaz made three further appearances in the 2018 Asian Games, again as part of the Pakistani U-23 side.

His first senior appearance was against Yemen at the 2018 FIFA World Cup qualification. He scored his first goal on 4 November 2018, against Nepal in the 2018 SAFF Championship, scoring a penalty in the 36th minute. His second senior goal came in the same tournament against Bhutan.

Career statistics

International

International goals
''As of match played on played 12 December 2018

References

Living people
1996 births
Pakistani footballers
Association football forwards
Pakistan international footballers
Footballers at the 2014 Asian Games
Asian Games competitors for Pakistan